Joshua George Reynolds (born September 27, 1979) is a baseball coach and former pitcher. He played college baseball at Central Missouri from 1998 to 2000, before playing professionally from 2000–2003. He then served as the head coach of the Northwestern Wildcats (2022).

Playing career
Reynolds attended and played college baseball at the University of Central Missouri. As a freshman, Reynolds was a second team All-Mid-America Intercollegiate Athletics Association (MIAA) selection and was named the Conference's Freshman of the Year. As a sophomore in 1999, he led the Mules in wins (11), strikeouts (67) and innings pitched (87.0), on his way to being named First Team All-MIAA. Reynolds turned in his best season of his college career in 2000, registering 12 wins in 97.0 innings. His efforts during the 2000 season earned him the MIAA MVP.

Reynolds was selected in the 3rd round of the 2000 Major League Baseball draft by the New York Mets. He decided to forgo his senior season and sign with the Mets, who assigned him to the Pittsfield Mets. Reynolds finished the season with a 1-1 record and a 4.39 ERA. Reynolds pitched for the St. Lucie Mets of the Class A-Advanced Florida State League in 2001, finishing the year with a 4.95 ERA in 11 games started. In 2002, he began the season with St. Lucie, but was traded on July 31, along with Jason Bay and Bobby Jones to the San Diego Padres for Steve Reed and Jason Middlebrook. The Padres assigned him to the Lake Elsinore Storm, he finished the season with a 14-7 record and a 3.79 ERA in 23 starts. He would spend the 2003 season split between the Lake Elsinore Storm and the Sarasota Red Sox, posting a 4.07 ERA in 26 games, mostly a reliever.

Coaching career
Reynolds decided to give up playing, and took a graduate assistant job with the Kansas State Wildcats. After three years at Kansas State, he joined the coaching staff of Northeast Texas Community College as their pitching coach. After just a single season with Northeast Texas, he joined the coaching staff of the Evansville Purple Aces. Reynolds made his return to Kansas State in 2011, this time as the pitching coach. In 2016, Reynolds was named the pitching coach of the Northwestern Wildcats.

On May 31, 2021, Reynolds was named the interim head coach for the Wildcats.

Head coaching record

References

Northwestern Wildcats bio

Living people
1979 births
Baseball players from Missouri
Central Missouri Mules baseball players
Kansas State Wildcats baseball coaches
Lake Elsinore Storm players
Northwestern Wildcats baseball coaches
Pittsfield Mets players
Sarasota Red Sox players
St. Lucie Mets players